Agile learning generally refers to the transfer of agile methods of project work, especially Scrum, to learning processes. Likewise, agile learning proceeds in incremental steps and through an Iterative design which alternates between phases of learning and doing. The tutors rather have the role of a learning attendant or supporter. In a narrower sense, it is intended to allow competence-oriented, media-based learning in the work process within companies.

Background 
Scrum is a framework for project and product management, in particular for agile software development. Scrum employs an iterative, incremental approach to optimize predictability and control risk. It has been developed from the experience that many development projects are too complex to be included in a full-scale plan, and an essential part of the requirements cannot be fully understood or defined up front. In order to eliminate these ambiguities, work is broken into actions that can be completed within time-boxed iterations, called sprints – with clear goals and regular feedback loops. During a sprint, progress and interim results are monitored in short daily meetings. At the end of a sprint, the results, the working process, and the cooperation are reflected upon and a new interval begins.

In companies

Requirements 
The framework of scrum can be well adjusted to the requirements of companies for a dynamic, workplace-integrated competence development and the subsequent frequency and intensity with which employees have to educate themselves further and acquire new skills. As complexity and dynamics in the internal and external specialization and collaborations increase the need for training and competence development increases as well. In terms of competence development, organizations therefore have concrete needs that are not met well by classical forms of qualification (e.g. seminar courses, continuing education courses), namely:

 "Reduce the time it takes an employee to acquire the necessary competencies to do their job in the most efficient and effective manner"
 "Change the learning context rapidly and in response to the real world"
 "Facilitate knowledge sharing within an organization"
 "Support a soft failure environment where mistakes have no impact on the real world, thus promoting a willingness to engage in measured risk-taking, focused on achieving a high level of polished performance in the real world"
There is a need for the integration of knowledge and content management with collaboration technologies and for developing a new (online) manufacturing training methodology in order to train and build the manufacturing workforce of the future. Such learning environments and learning processes have as requirements:
 High scalability, to enable qualification measures from a few hours to several hundred;
 Content adaptability, to include new topics as quickly as possible;
 Connectivity to existing organizational structures and software infrastructure in order to start with little effort

So far, however, there are hardly any suitable continuing education formats for this need. One answer to this is the agile learning approach with its flexibility in relation to all three above mentioned requirements. In accordance with scrum and established psychological findings for an effective pursuit of goals, Agile learning divides an extensive (learning) process into individual, manageable learning phases. Here, too, the three pillars of scrum of transparency, verification, adaptation apply.

Key elements 
The key elements of agile learning in companies are:
 Teams of peers with similar development goals and a broad spectrum of backgrounds
 Coaches (internal / external) to support the learning process
 Company stakeholders (management, human resource department) represented by a sponsor ("product owner" in Scrum).
 Learning objectives which are broken down within the team into personal learning goals 
 Working on tasks from the actual working context
 Sprints to reach sub goals/milestones. The coaches will closely guide this process
 After completion the results will be presented to the project owner and be verified by him/her

Roles within agile learning 
Parallel to Scrum, three roles can be described, which have slightly different tasks in agile learning.

Sponsor ("product owner") 
 Defines the learning field and determines a suitable project
 Creates the organizational framework
 Is a liaison person into the organization
 Receives the technical learning progress

Coach ("Scrum master") 
 Technical, didactic and methodical support
 Moderate the process and guide the reflection
 Support in the processing of learning objectives

This role may be supplemented by topic/issue-specific experts

Team 
 Personal learning goals in sprints
 Collaborative, mostly digitally supported collaboration
 Regular joint reflection on the learning process
 Personal, social and professional development

Agile learning in university 
In agile teaching and learning, students can take on the role of the client; the agile software development process in which the client is involved is replaced by the learning/teaching process with students and tutors as actors; the increments that implement new functionality in short cycles correspond to the continuous increase in students' abilities in the agile learning/teaching process. Alternatively to enrich the learning process and remove student learning from hypothetical situations, an industry client, a real world problem can be used as the foci for learning and acquisition of requisite skills.  

Agile methods can be incorporated into courses both as content and as the working method for students. In line with agile concepts they can also be adapted. For instance agile problem based learning is a pedagogical and curricular vehicle used to blur the work study silos, informal and formal learning spaces and facilitate connected learning ( Agile problem based teaching and learning methods have been used to cultivate learning agility in students in an effort to prepare them for ambiguous and complex work contexts and help student pro-type solutions for complex issues such as human trafficking, informal settlements, youth unemployment and organ donation  Learning agility in a university context is a learned ability which allows students to use feedback from previous assessments and apply their learning in other related or unrelated tasks. 
Agile implies that learners create content and develop skills alongside teachers in a collaborative yet competitive environment mediated by technology. The role of the teacher is centered on facilitation and project direction from an informed perspective. Learners become self-directed, team-oriented, and individually resilient lifelong learners. A study on an implementation of the agile method into an online higher education context showed that the agile strategies incorporated into project-based learning facilitated team regulation and project management.

Potentials and limits of agile learning 
In agile learning the participants may gain new competencies that are, unlike in classical formal education, directly linked to their work context. In pursuit of the individual problem-solving as well as in exchange with the learning team and the coaches, their competence increase becomes recognizable to themselves, so that successful learning strategies can also be harnessed in future. Therefore, the main potential of this approach lies in the practical relevance of the acquired competencies and in the demand-oriented communication of contents, techniques, and skills.

Like any project-oriented teaching/learning method, agile learning reaches its boundaries when the goal is the systematic coverage of a pre-defined curriculum. Exemplary learning cannot ensure this. For subject areas where particular importance is attached to the completeness of learning content (e.g. safety at work or fire protection), classical further education formats are to be preferred. There, agile learning projects can only supplement training with a transfer supporting the sustainable implementation of the learning content in everyday working life.

References

Further reading 

Learning
Project management